Prabal Neog (Assamese: প্ৰৱাল নেওগ), aliases Benudhar Bora and Amar Moran, is the ex-commander of the 28th Battalion of ULFA, the banned militant outfit of Assam. Neog baceme commander of 28th Battalion of ULFA after the death of the battalion's founding commander Tapan Baruah alias Madan Das

Neog hails from Lesenga village at Makum in Tinsukia district of Assam. His wife Bonti Lahon, who is also said to be an ULFA cadre, hails from Moran in Dibrugarh district. He joined the outfit in 1988 and was trained in guerrilla operations in Myanmar. Before his militancy life, he was the vice-president of Asom Jatiyatabadi Yuba Chatra Parishad, Tinsukia district unit.

Arrest and release
On September 17, 2008, police arrested Neog along with his wife and son from Tezpur. He was carrying about Rs 2.8 lakh in cash but no arms or any incriminating document was recovered from him at the time of his arrest. On July 23, 2008, he has been released from the Dibrugarh Central Jail. Now he is one of the leaders of the Pro-talk ULFA.

Charges
He is said to be the main planner and the key executor of the killings of Hindi-speaking people in Assam. Besides, according to police, he was also involved in a large number of bomb blasts and almost all major extortion operations in the state.

See also
List of top leaders of ULFA
Sanjukta Mukti Fouj
28th Battalion (ULFA)

References

People from Tinsukia district
Living people
ULFA members
Year of birth missing (living people)